Claudymar Garcés Sequera (born 2 October 1998) is a Venezuelan karateka. She won the silver medal in the women's kumite 61 kg event at the 2019 Pan American Games held in Lima, Peru.

She represented Venezuela at the 2020 Summer Olympics in Tokyo, Japan. She competed in the women's 61 kg event.

Career 

In 2018, she won the gold medal in the women's kumite 61 kg event at the Central American and Caribbean Games held in Barranquilla, Colombia.

In 2021, she qualified at the World Olympic Qualification Tournament held in Paris, France to compete at the 2020 Summer Olympics in Tokyo, Japan. She finished in third place in her pool during the pool stage in the women's 61 kg event and she did not advance to compete in the semifinals.

She won the silver medal in the women's 61 kg event at the 2022 Bolivarian Games held in Valledupar, Colombia. She also won the silver medal in her event at the 2022 South American Games held in Asunción, Paraguay.

Achievements

References

External links 
 

Living people
1998 births
Place of birth missing (living people)
Venezuelan female karateka
Pan American Games medalists in karate
Pan American Games silver medalists for Venezuela
Medalists at the 2019 Pan American Games
Karateka at the 2019 Pan American Games
Competitors at the 2018 Central American and Caribbean Games
Central American and Caribbean Games gold medalists for Venezuela
Central American and Caribbean Games medalists in karate
Karateka at the 2020 Summer Olympics
Olympic karateka of Venezuela
South American Games silver medalists for Venezuela
South American Games medalists in karate
Competitors at the 2022 South American Games
21st-century Venezuelan women